Marko Ćopić (born 14 July 2003) is a Serbian footballer who currently plays as a goalkeeper for Torlak on loan from Red Star Belgrade.

References

External links
 

2003 births
Living people
Serbian footballers
Association football goalkeepers
Serbian First League players
RFK Grafičar Beograd players
Serbia youth international footballers